The 1952 Boston Red Sox season was the 52nd season in the franchise's Major League Baseball history. The Red Sox finished sixth in the American League (AL) with a record of 76 wins and 78 losses, 19 games behind the New York Yankees, who went on to win the 1952 World Series.

Regular season

Season standings

Record vs. opponents

Opening Day lineup

Notable transactions 
 June 3, 1952: Walt Dropo, Fred Hatfield, Don Lenhardt, Johnny Pesky, and Bill Wight were traded by the Red Sox to the Detroit Tigers for Dizzy Trout, George Kell, Johnny Lipon, and Hoot Evers.

Roster

Player stats

Batting

Starters by position 
Note: Pos = Position; G = Games played; AB = At bats; H = Hits; Avg. = Batting average; HR = Home runs; RBI = Runs batted in

Other batters 
Note: G = Games played; AB = At bats; H = Hits; Avg. = Batting average; HR = Home runs; RBI = Runs batted in

Pitching

Starting pitchers 
Note: G = Games pitched; IP = Innings pitched; W = Wins; L = Losses; ERA = Earned run average; SO = Strikeouts

Other pitchers 
Note: G = Games pitched; IP = Innings pitched; W = Wins; L = Losses; ERA = Earned run average; SO = Strikeouts

Relief pitchers 
Note: G = Games pitched; W = Wins; L = Losses; SV = Saves; ERA = Earned run average; SO = Strikeouts

Farm system

References

External links
1952 Boston Red Sox team page at Baseball Reference
1952 Boston Red Sox season at baseball-almanac.com

Boston Red Sox seasons
Boston Red Sox
Boston Red Sox
1950s in Boston